{{DISPLAYTITLE:C9H11NO}}
The molecular formula C9H11NO (molar mass: 149.19 g/mol, exact mass: 149.0841 u) may refer to:

 4'-Aminopropiophenone
 Cathinone
 para-Dimethylaminobenzaldehyde

Molecular formulas